Gilbert Stork (December 31, 1921 – October 21, 2017) was an organic chemist. For a quarter of a century he was the Eugene Higgins Professor of Chemistry Emeritus at Columbia University. He is known for making significant contributions to the total synthesis of natural products, including a lifelong fascination with the synthesis of quinine. In so doing he also made a number of contributions to mechanistic understanding of reactions, and performed pioneering work on enamine chemistry, leading to development of the Stork enamine alkylation.
It is believed he was responsible for the first planned stereocontrolled synthesis as well as the first natural product to be synthesised with high stereoselectivity.

Stork was also an accomplished mentor of young chemists and many of his students have gone on to make significant contributions in their own right.

Early years 
Gilbert Stork was born in the Ixelles municipality of Brussels, Belgium on December 31, 1921. The oldest of 3 children, his middle brother, Michel, died in infancy, but he remained close with his younger sister Monique his whole life.  His family had Jewish origins, although Gilbert himself didn't recall them being religiously active. The family moved to Nice when Gilbert was about 14 (circa. 1935) and remained there until 1939. During this period, Gilbert completed his lycée studies, distinguishing himself in French literature and writing. Characterizing himself during those years as "not terribly self-confident," and uncertain whether he could find employment in a profession he enjoyed, Gilbert considered applying for a colonial civil service job in French Indochina. However, the outbreak of World War II that year led the family to flee to New York, where his father's older brother, Sylvain, had already emigrated.

Education 
Gilbert studied for a Bachelor of Science at the University of Florida, from 1940 to 1942. He then moved to the University of Wisconsin–Madison for this PhD, which he obtained in 1945 under the supervision of Samuel M. McElvain. While at Wisconsin he met Carl Djerassi, with whom he would go on to form a lasting friendship.

Career 
 1946 Harvard University: Instructor; 1948 Assistant Professor
 1953 Columbia University: Associate Professor; 1955 Professor; 1967–1993 Eugene Higgins Professor; *1993 Professor Emeritus

Elected to 
 U.S. National Academy of Sciences, 1961
 American Academy of Arts and Sciences, 1962
 Foreign Member of the French Academy of Sciences, 1989
 American Philosophical Society, 1995
 The Royal Society, UK 1999

Incidents

The explosive steak 
During his time at the University of Wisconsin, Stork kept a steak on his windowsill in the winter in order to keep it refrigerated. The steak began to degrade and to dispose of it Stork put it in a hot acid bath used to clean glassware which contained nitric and sulphuric acids. He was then concerned he would produce nitroglycerine due to the glycerine in the steak and the presence of nitric and sulphuric acids. However, due to the high temperature of the bath, the oxidation of glycerol was much faster than the nitration of glycerin thus preventing the formation of explosives.

Awarded Honorary Fellowship or membership 
 Chemists' Club of New York, 1974
 Pharmaceutical Society of Japan, 1973
 Chemical Society of Japan, 2002
 Royal Society of Chemistry, UK, 1983
 Chairman Organic Division of the American Chemical Society, 1966–1967

Awards 
Professor Stork received a number of awards and honors including the following:

 1957 Award in Pure Chemistry of the American Chemical Society
 1959 Guggenheim Foundation Fellow
 1961 Baekeland Medal, North Jersey ACS
 1962 Harrison Howe Award
 1966 Edward Curtis Franklin Memorial Award, Stanford University
 1967 ACS Award for Creative Work in Synthetic Organic Chemistry
 1971 Synthetic Organic Chemical Manufacturers Association Gold Medal
 1973 Nebraska Award
 1978 Roussel Prize, Paris
 1980 Nichols Medal, New York ACS, Arthur C. Cope Award, ACS
 1982 Edgar Fahs Smith Award, Philadelphia ACS
 1982 Willard Gibbs Medal, Chicago ACS
 1982 National Academy of Sciences Award in Chemical Sciences
 1982 National Medal of Science from Ronald Reagan; Linus Pauling Award
 1985 Tetrahedron Prize
 1986 Remsen Award, Maryland ACS
 1986 Cliff S. Hamilton Award
 1987 Monie A Ferst Award and Medal, Georgia Tech.
 1991 Roger Adams Award
 1992 George Kenner Award, Liverpool
 1992 Robert Robinson Lectureship, University of Manchester
 1992 Chemical Pioneer Award, American Institute of Chemists
 1993 Welch Award in Chemistry, Robert A. Welch Foundation
 1994 Allan R. Day Award, Philadelphia Organic Chemists Club
 1995 Wolf Prize, Israel
 2002 Sir Derek Barton Gold medal, Royal Society of Chemistry
 2005 Herbert C. Brown Award, American Chemical Society

Stork also held honorary doctorates from Lawrence University, the University of Wisconsin–Madison, the University of Paris, the University of Rochester, and Columbia University.

The inaugural Gilbert Stork Lecture was held in his honor in 2014 at his alma mater, the University of Wisconsin-Madison. Gilbert Stork named lecture series are also held at other institutions, including Columbia University and the University of Pennsylvania, as a result of his endowments.

He was fêted for his sense of humor and colorful personality by historian of chemistry Jeffrey I. Seeman who published a collection of "Storkisms".

References

External links
Finding aid to the Gilbert Stork papers at Columbia University Rare Book & Manuscript Library

1921 births
2017 deaths
Belgian emigrants to the United States
Belgian Jews
American people of Belgian-Jewish descent
American chemists
Columbia University faculty
Harvard University faculty
Jewish American scientists
Jewish chemists
National Medal of Science laureates
Foreign Members of the Royal Society
Belgian chemists
University of Florida alumni
University of Wisconsin–Madison alumni
Wolf Prize in Chemistry laureates
Members of the French Academy of Sciences
Members of the United States National Academy of Sciences
Organic chemists
21st-century American Jews